The 2007 Medicine Hat municipal election was held Monday, October 15, 2007. Since 1968, provincial legislation has required every municipality to hold triennial elections. The citizens of Medicine Hat elected one mayor, eight aldermen (all at large), the five Medicine Hat School District No. 76 trustees (at large), and four of the Medicine Hat Catholic Separate Regional Division No. 20's five trustees (four from Ward Medicine Hat). The incumbent mayor Garth Valley, did not run. There was a voter turnout of 47.5%, and an average 5.8 aldermen per ballot.

Results
Bold indicates elected, and incumbents are italicized.

Mayor

Aldermen

Public School Trustees

Separate School Trustees

References

Medicine Hat
Politics of Medicine Hat